How Do You Keep the Music Playing? is an album by American jazz pianist Larry Willis recorded in 1992 and released on the SteepleChase label.

Track listing
All compositions by Larry Willis except where noted
 "Gloria's Step" (Scott LaFaro) – 5:01
 "How Do You Keep the Music Playing?" (Michel Legrand, Alan Bergman, Marilyn Bergman) – 7:31
 "All of You" (Cole Porter) – 6:21
 "North West" (Jeff Williams) – 7:31
 "Slick Rick" – 7:46
 "Missing You" – 7:27
 "Ezekiel Saw the Wheel" (Traditional) – 5:22
 "Dance Cadaverous" (Wayne Shorter) – 7:21
 "Alone Together" (Arthur Schwartz, Howard Dietz) – 8:37

Personnel
Larry Willis – piano
David Williams – bass
Lewis Nash – drums

References

SteepleChase Records albums
Larry Willis albums
1992 albums